Ceanothus parryi, with the common name Parry ceanothus, is a species of shrub in the buckthorn family Rhamnaceae. It is native to Oregon and northern California, where it grows in the canyons of coastal mountain ranges.

Description
Ceanothus parryi is an erect shrub approaching 5 meters in maximum height. The woody parts are reddish brown and woolly when new, darkening with age and shedding most of the hairs. The evergreen leaves are alternately arranged, oval in shape and edged with glandular teeth. They are dark green and hairless on the upper surfaces, paler and woolly on the undersides. The inflorescence is a long cluster of deep blue flowers, up to about 15 centimeters long. The fruit is a smooth, 3-lobed capsule a few millimeters long.

References

External links
Jepson Manual Treatment
USDA Plants Profile
Photo gallery

parryi
Flora of California
Flora of Oregon
Natural history of the California Coast Ranges
Plants described in 1888
Taxa named by William Trelease